Scalps is a 1987 Spaghetti Western directed by Bruno Mattei.

Plot
A rancher and an Indian woman warrior seek revenge on the Southern cutthroats that slaughtered her village.

References

External links

Spaghetti Western films
1987 films
1980s Italian-language films
Italian Western (genre) films
1987 Western (genre) films